The  Washington Redskins season was the franchise's 8th season in the National Football League (NFL) and their 3rd in Washington, D.C. It began with the team improved on their 6–3–2 record from 1938, finishing at 8-2-1, but missed the playoff for the second year in a row.

Schedule

Standings

Washington
Washington Redskins seasons
Washington